The  or Fukuchi Dam is a rock-fill embankment dam on the Fukuchi River  northeast of Higashi, Okinawa Prefecture, Japan. The purpose of the dam, the tallest in Okinawa, is water supply and flood control.

Background
Under the Ryukyu Domestic Water Corporation, the U.S. Army Corps of Engineers began constructing the dam in 1969. After the United States Civil Administration of the Ryukyu Islands returned administration of Okinawa back to Japan in 1972, construction became the responsibility of the Japanese government. The dam was completed in 1972, and the auxiliary spillway in December 1974. The dam was later raised to accommodate an improved intake and an additional  in water elevation. This additional work was completed in 1991.

Design
The reservoir's capacity is  while  serves as active (or "useful") capacity. The dam is equipped with a drum gate-controlled chute spillway. This spillway is a siphon-type and operates automatically to help drain the reservoir during flooding. It has a  capacity and discharges directly into the Pacific Ocean.

References

Dams in Okinawa Prefecture
Rock-filled dams
Japan–United States relations
Dams completed in 1974